The 1982 Women's Asian Games Volleyball Tournament was held in New Delhi, India from 20 November to 3 December 1982.

Results

Final standing

References

External links
OCA official website

Women's Volleyball